The 1880 United States presidential election in Indiana took place on November 2, 1880, as part of the 1880 United States presidential election. Voters chose 15 representatives, or electors to the Electoral College, who voted for president and vice president.

Indiana voted for the Republican nominee, James A. Garfield, over the Democratic nominee, Winfield Scott Hancock. Garfield won the state by a narrow margin of 1.42%.

Results

See also
 United States presidential elections in Indiana

Notes

References

Indiana
1880
1880 Indiana elections